Darudi (also Romanized as Darūdī; also known as Dow Rūdī) is a village in Arabkhaneh Rural District, Shusef District, Nehbandan County, South Khorasan Province, Iran. At the 2006 census, its population was 12, in 4 families.

References 

Populated places in Nehbandan County